The Henderson Little Bear is an American homebuilt aircraft that was designed and produced by Henderson Aero Specialities of Felton, Delaware, introduced in 1993. The aircraft is a replica of the Piper J-3 Cub (a little bear is a "cub"). When it was available the aircraft was supplied as a kit or in the form of plans for amateur construction.

Design and development
The Little Bear features a strut-braced high-wing, a two-seats-in-tandem enclosed cockpit accessed via doors, fixed conventional landing gear and a single engine in tractor configuration.

The aircraft fuselage is made from welded steel with all surfaces covered in doped aircraft fabric.

The manufacturer estimated the construction time from the supplied kit as 400 hours.

Operational history
By 1998 the company reported that five kits had been sold and two aircraft were completed and flying.

In December 2013 one example was registered in the United States with the Federal Aviation Administration.

Specifications (Little Bear)

References

Little Bear
1990s United States sport aircraft
1990s United States civil utility aircraft
Single-engined tractor aircraft
High-wing aircraft
Homebuilt aircraft
Aircraft first flown in 1993